Milena Foltýnová-Gschiessl (24 June 1950 – 24 December 1993) was originally a Czech and later an Austrian handball player, who played for both the Czechoslovak and Austrian national teams. She played for the Czechoslovakia women's national handball team, and represented Czechoslovakia at the 1980 Summer Olympics in Moscow. She played for the Austria women's national handball team at the 1984 Summer Olympics in Los Angeles. She died in Vienna in 1993.

References

External links

1950 births
1993 deaths
People from Litvínov
Czechoslovak female handball players
Olympic handball players of Czechoslovakia
Handball players at the 1980 Summer Olympics
Austrian female handball players
Olympic handball players of Austria
Handball players at the 1984 Summer Olympics
Czech emigrants to Austria
Sportspeople from the Ústí nad Labem Region